The 1972 United States Senate election in Oregon took place on November 7, 1972. Incumbent Republican Senator Mark Hatfield was re-elected to a second term in office, defeating Democrat Wayne Morse.

Primary elections 
Primary elections were held on May 23, 1972.

Republican primary

Candidates
Kenneth A. Brown, farmer, unsuccessful candidate for Republican nomination for Oregon's 1st congressional district in 1952
Lynn Engdahl, professor at Pacific University
Mark Hatfield, incumbent Senator
John E. Smets, manufacturer

Results

Democratic primary

Candidates
Robert B. Duncan, former U.S. Congressman for Oregon's 4th congressional district, Democratic nominee for U.S. Senate in 1966
Wayne Morse, former U.S. Senator
Don S. Willner, state senator
Ralph Wiser, businessman

Results

General election

Results

See also 
 1972 United States Senate elections

References

Bibliography
 
  

1972
Oregon
United States Senate